The 2011 Ricoh Women's British Open was held 28–31 July at Carnoustie Golf Links in Angus, Scotland. It was the 35th Women's British Open, and the 11th as a major championship on the LPGA Tour. This was the first time for the Women's British Open at Carnoustie, which previously hosted seven Open Championships, most recently in 2007.

Yani Tseng became the first to successfully defend her title at the Women's British Open as a major championship, four strokes ahead of runner-up Brittany Lang. She became youngest player, male or female, to win five major titles.

Exemptions and qualifying events
The field for the tournament was 144, and golfers gained a place in three ways. Most players earned exemptions based on good past performances on the Ladies European Tour, the LPGA and in previous major championships and top-ranked players in the Women's World Golf Rankings. The rest of the field earned entry by successfully competing in qualifying tournaments open to any professional female golfer or amateur with a low handicap.

There were 14 exemption categories for the 2011 Women's British Open. These included:

The top 15 finishers (and ties) from the 2010 Women's British Open.
The top 10 Ladies European Tour members in the Women's World Golf Rankings who did not finish in the top 15 of the 2010 Women's British Open.
The top 30 LPGA Tour members in the Women's World Golf Rankings who did not finish in the top 15 of the 2010 Women's British Open.
The top 25 on the current LET money list not already exempt from the 2010 Women's British Open or the world rankings.
The top 40 on the current LPGA Tour money list not already exempt from the 2010 Women's British Open or the world rankings.
The top five on the current LPGA of Japan Tour money list not already exempt from the 2010 Women's British Open or through the world rankings if they are also members of the LET or LPGA. (Note that these six categories have accounted for approximately 125 entries — or 5/6ths of the players in the final field.)
Winners of any recognised LET or LPGA events in the calendar year 2011.
The champions from the last 10 editions of the Women's British Open.
The champions of the last five editions of one of the other three LPGA majors.

Past champions in the field

Made the cut

Missed the cut

Course
The 2011 course layout at Carnoustie Golf Links.

Set-up

The short set-up of the course was criticized by several notable golfers and golf commentators. ESPN golf commentator and former LPGA pro Jane Crafter called the LGU "out of touch" with how current women players can play. Defending champion Yani Tseng commented that the famous hole number 18 was set up so that it "put all of the bunkers out of play, put all of the burns out of play." The course groundskeeper agreed that the women had been given "a watered-down version" of Carnoustie and that he did that intentionally after receiving too much criticism for a difficult set-up for the Open Championship in 1999.

Round summaries

First round
Thursday, 28 July 2011 

source:

Second round
Friday, 29 July 2011

source:

Amateurs: Kang (−3), Popov (+1), Pretswell (+2), Taylor (+4), Foster (+6), Meadow (+7).

Third round
Saturday, 30 July 2011 

source:

Final round
Sunday, 31 July 2011

source:

Amateurs: Kang (+2), Popov (+11).

Scorecard
Final round

Cumulative tournament scores, relative to par
{|class="wikitable" span = 50 style="font-size:85%;
|-
|style="background: Red;" width=10|
|Eagle
|style="background: Pink;" width=10|
|Birdie
|style="background: PaleGreen;" width=10|
|Bogey
|style="background: Green;" width=10|
|Double bogey
|}

References

External links

LPGA.com - Women's British Open - microsite

Women's British Open
Golf tournaments in Scotland
British Open
Women's British Open
Women's British Open